Cerchezu is a commune in Constanța County, Northern Dobruja, Romania.

The commune includes two villages:
 Cerchezu (historical name: Cerchezchioi), named after the Circassian minority that settled the region.
 Căscioarele (historical name: Mamușlia)
 Măgura (historical name: Docuzaci)
 Viroaga (historical name: Calfachioi)

The territory of the commune also includes the former village of Căciulați (historical name: Cealmagea), nominally merged with Viroaga by the 1968 administrative reform.

Demographics
At the 2011 census, Cerchezu had 1,287 Romanians (99.84%), 2 others (0.16%). Before World War II the commune had a small German minority.

References

Communes in Constanța County
Localities in Northern Dobruja
Circassians in Romania